Board of Secondary Education, Rajasthan  (abbreviated BSER) is a board of education for school level education in the Indian state Rajasthan. RBSE is a state agency of the Government of Rajasthan and has its headquarters in Ajmer.
Board is responsible for promotion and development of secondary education in Rajasthan state. BSER was set up in the year 1957 and constituted under the Rajasthan Secondary Education Act 1957. Results of examinations conducted by BSER can be accessed via website.

See also
Council for the Indian School Certificate Examinations (CISCE)
National Institute of Open Schooling (NIOS)
Secondary School Leaving Certificate (SSLC)

References

External links

Official Results website 2020

Ajmer
State agencies of Rajasthan
Education in Rajasthan
Rajasthan
Government agencies established in 1957
1957 establishments in Rajasthan